The men's discus throw event at the 2009 European Athletics U23 Championships was held in Kaunas, Lithuania, at S. Dariaus ir S. Girėno stadionas (Darius and Girėnas Stadium) on 17 and 18 July.

Medalists

Results

Final
18 July

Qualifications
17 July
Qualifying 57.00 or 12 best to the Final

Group A

Group B

Participation
According to an unofficial count, 24 athletes from 18 countries participated in the event.

 (1)
 (1)
 (1)
 (1)
 (1)
 (1)
 (1)
 (1)
 (2)
 (1)
 (2)
 (1)
 (3)
 (1)
 (1)
 (2)
 (2)
 (1)

References

Discus throw
Discus throw at the European Athletics U23 Championships